Spilia (Greek meaning "cave") may refer to the following places:

Greece
Spilia, Cephalonia, a village in Cephalonia 
Spilia, Chania, a village in the Chania regional unit
Spilia, Heraklion, a village in the Heraklion regional unit
Spilia, Kastoria, a village in the Kastoria regional unit
Spilia, Kozani, a village in the Kozani regional unit
Spilia, Larissa, a village in the Larissa regional unit
Spilia, Messenia, a village in Messenia 
Spilia, Phocis, a village in Phocis

Cyprus
Spilia, Cyprus, a village